Kanuleh-ye Pain (also Romanized as Kanūleh-ye Pā’īn; also known as Kanūleh) is a village in Kakavand-e Gharbi Rural District, Kakavand District, Delfan County, Lorestan Province, Iran. At the 2006 census, its population was 33, in 4 families.

References 

Towns and villages in Delfan County